Chandler v Cape plc [2012] EWCA Civ 525 is a decision of the Court of Appeal which addresses the availability of damages for a tort victim from a parent company, in circumstances where the victim suffered industrial injury during employment by a subsidiary company.

Facts
David Chandler had been employed by a wholly owned subsidiary company of Cape plc for just over 18 months, between 1959 and 1962. In 2007, Chandler discovered that as a result of exposure to asbestos during that period of employment, he had developed asbestosis. The subsidiary no longer existed and had no policy of insurance covering claims for damages for asbestosis. Chandler brought a claim against Cape plc, alleging it had owed (and breached) a duty of care to him. Cape plc denied that it owed a duty of care to the employees of its subsidiary company.

Judgment

High Court
At first instance, Wyn Williams J held that Cape plc owed Mr Chandler a duty of care, applying the threefold test (foreseeability, proximity and fairness) laid down in Caparo Industries Plc v Dickman. Cape plc had had actual knowledge of the subsidiary employees' working conditions, and the asbestos risk was obvious.  It had employed a scientific and medical officer to be responsible for health and safety issues and had, in the circumstances, retained responsibility for ensuring that its own employees, and those of its subsidiaries, were not harmed.

Court of Appeal
Cape plc appealed to the Court of Appeal, but its appeal was dismissed.  Arden LJ (with whom the other judges agreed) concluded that Cape plc had assumed responsibility to Mr Chandler and was answerable for the injury which he had suffered.

Significance
The decision is significant because it represents the first time that an injured employee of a subsidiary company has established that his employer's parent company owed him a duty of care. Arden LJ dismissed any suggestion that the case involved piercing the corporate veil, but the outcome has an equivalent effect in that (through the application of tortious principles) it imposes liability upon a parent company despite the fact that the parent company is a legal entity separate from that of its subsidiary.

The reasoning contained in the judgement is consistent with the common law delictual principles that have application in South Africa and likely in other common law jurisdictions. While no similar ruling has yet been made in a South African court, the decision will be relied upon by the plaintiffs in a class action brought on behalf of several tens of thousands of former Southern African gold mine workers, who have contracted silicosis as a result of work in the mines, against South African gold mine owners and their parent companies.(Bongani Nkala and others v Harmony Gold Mining Company and Others, Case No 48226/12, South Gauteng High Court)<goldminersilicosis.co.za>

The most significant parent company defendant is Anglo American South Africa Limited, which has now divested itself of all its gold mining assets but, for several decades, owned and controlled gold mine owning subsidiaries responsible for about 40% of South Africa's gold production. As most of its former gold mine owning subsidiaries have been wound up and deregistered, the decision in Chandler v Cape plc offers avenue for recovery to thousands of former mine workers who might otherwise have no realistic prospect of recovering compensation for their losses.

See also

Corporate veil in the United Kingdom

References

E McGaughey, 'Donoghue v Salomon in the High Court' (2011) 4 Journal of Personal Injury Law 249, on SSRN
E McGaughey, A Casebook on Labour Law (Hart 2019) ch 3, 145

External links
Cape plc's webpage

United Kingdom company case law
English tort case law
Court of Appeal (England and Wales) cases
2012 in case law
2012 in British law